

Laguna Mandioré is a lake on the border of Brazil and Bolivia.

Lakes of Santa Cruz Department (Bolivia)
Lakes of Brazil
Bolivia–Brazil border
International lakes of South America
Landforms of Mato Grosso